Battle of Vyborg may refer to:

Battle of Vyborg, battle of the 1918 Finnish Civil War
Battle of Vyborg Bay (1790), naval battle of the Russo-Swedish War 
Battle of Vyborg Bay (1940), last battle of the Winter War
Battle of Vyborg (1941), battle of World War II : Finns retake the city. 
Battle of Vyborg Bay (1944), battle of the World War II : Soviets approach the city.